Benjamin Philip Bonetti is a self-help author, NLP Practitioner and hypnotist from England.

Career 
Before starting his self-help and life coaching career, Bonetti was in the British Army.

Publications

Books 

 How To Stress Less Wiley 2014
 How To Change Your Life: Who am I and What Should I Do with My Life? Wiley 2013
 Fat Mind Fat Body Benjamin Bonetti 2012
 Don't Struggle Quietly Benjamin Bonetti Ltd 2012
 Entrepreneurs Always Drive on Empty Benjamin Bonetti 2010
 Making Your Money Last: 7 Steps to Debt Free Living Benjamin Bonetti 2010
 365 Ways To Do Your Life's Work Benjamin Bonetti and Terry Elston 2011
 Inspirational & Motivational Quotes Benjamin Bonetti and Terry Elston 2010
 Quotes to Remember - 100 Motivational Quotes Benjamin Bonetti 2010

References 

1982 births
British self-help writers
British hypnotists
Living people